Desulfobacterium autotrophicum is a mesophilic sulfate-reducing bacterium. Its genome has been sequenced.

References

Further reading

Campbell, Brian J., et al. "Hydrogen isotopic fractionation in lipid biosynthesis by H2-consuming Desulfobacterium autotrophicum."Geochimica et Cosmochimica Acta 73.10 (2009): 2744–2757.

External links 

LPSN
Type strain of Desulfobacterium autotrophicum at BacDive -  the Bacterial Diversity Metadatabase

Desulfobacterales
Bacteria described in 1988